Ramgarh or Ramgarh Shekhawati is a town and a municipality in Ramgarh tehsil of Sikar district in the Indian state of Rajasthan.

Geography
Ramgarh Shekhawati town is located in Shekhawati region of Rajasthan. The area surrounding this town is semi-arid. The town located at trijunction of Churu district in north, Jhunjhunu district in East and Sikar district in south. The city of Churu is at a distance of about 17 km from the town.The famous personality Shri Shivraj Kavia's village Nimakidhani is 3 km from RamgRh Shekhawati.

Demographics
According to the 2001 Indian census, Ramgarh had a population of 33024. Males constitute 51% of the population and females 49%. Ramgarh has an average literacy rate of 59%, lower than the national average of 59.5%: male literacy is 69%, and female literacy is 48%. In Ramgarh, 18% of the population is under 6 years of age.

Transport 
Ramgarh is well connected by road and rail transport. National Highway 52 passes on western outskirt of town. Ramgarh Shekhawati railway station is located on the eastern part of the town.

References

External links

Cities and towns in Sikar district